Srđan Obradović (Serbian Cyrillic: Cpђaн Oбpaдoвић; born 16 March 1970 in Belgrade) is a Serbian former football defender.

Career
Besides Serbian top league club OFK Beograd where he played most of his career, he also played for several other clubs, including Serbian FK Napredak Kruševac and FK Radnički Pirot, Portuguese Liga club S.C. Braga, Eredivisie club FC Utrecht, Greek Beta Ethniki club Panserraikos F.C., Macedonian First League club FK Rabotnički and Hungarian Second league clubs FC Tatabánya, Lombard-Pápa TFC and Szombathelyi Haladás.

External sources

 

1970 births
Living people
Footballers from Belgrade
Serbian footballers
Yugoslav footballers
OFK Beograd players
FK Napredak Kruševac players
S.C. Braga players
Primeira Liga players
Expatriate footballers in Portugal
FC Utrecht players
Eredivisie players
Expatriate footballers in the Netherlands
Panserraikos F.C. players
Expatriate footballers in Greece
FK Rabotnički players
Expatriate footballers in North Macedonia
FC Tatabánya players
Lombard-Pápa TFC footballers
Szombathelyi Haladás footballers
Expatriate footballers in Hungary
Association football defenders